Italy competed at the 1984 Winter Paralympics in Innsbruck, Austria. 7 competitors from Italy won 1 medal including 0 gold, 0 silver and 1 bronze and finished 13th in the medal table.

Team 

The following athletes represented Italy at the 1984 Winter Paralympics:

 Maurizio Cagol
 Franz Gatscher
 Paolo Lorenzini
 Bruno Oberhammer
 Karl Schmuck
 Riccardo Tomasini
 Hubert Tscholl

Alpine skiing 

One athlete won a medal:

  Bruno Oberhammer, Men's Alpine Combination B2

Cross-country 

No medals were won in the cross-country events.

See also 

 Italy at the Paralympics
 Italy at the 1984 Winter Olympics

References 

1984
1984 in Italian sport
Nations at the 1984 Winter Paralympics